Diego Martín Gabriel (born 21 September 1974) is a Spanish actor, known for his performances in prime time television series, including Policías, en el corazón de la calle; Aquí no hay quien viva, Hermanos y detectives and Velvet.

Biography 
Born on 21 September 1974 in Madrid, he has wrongly claimed sometimes to have been born in Valladolid because of an emotional bonding, as he spent part of his youth there during weekends and holidays, due to his family having roots in the city: he has stated "My whole history with Valladolid is a story of my profession, a lie and a fiction. I have never felt very Madrilenian; Valladolid has always been my home, my landscape, my land, my smells". He is the grandson of poet Francisco Javier Martín Abril. After enrolling in a degree in law, he dropped out and started a career in acting instead.

He landed his first stable role in the TV series Periodistas in 1999.

Filmography 

Television

Film

References

External links
 

Living people
1974 births
Spanish male television actors
Spanish male film actors
21st-century Spanish male actors